Phoi Jaiswang (born 1930) is a Thai middle-distance runner. He competed in the men's 800 metres at the 1956 Summer Olympics.

References

External links
 

1930 births
Possibly living people
Athletes (track and field) at the 1956 Summer Olympics
Phoi Jaiswang
Phoi Jaiswang
Place of birth missing (living people)